Bank of Italy is the Bank of Italy or Banca d'Italia, the central bank of Italy.

Or it may refer to:
Bank of Italy (United States), a bank established in San Francisco, California and the forerunner of the Bank of America.

Or Bank of Italy or Bank of Italy Building may refer to individual bank buildings:

Bank of Italy (Fresno, California), listed on the National Register of Historic Places in Fresno County, California
Bank of Italy (Livermore, California), listed on the National Register of Historic Places in Alameda County, California
Bank of Italy (Paso Robles, California), listed on the National Register of Historic Places in San Luis Obispo County, California
Bank of Italy Building (San Francisco), California, a U.S. National Historic Landmark, listed on the National Register of Historic Places
Bank of Italy Building (San Jose, California), a U.S. National Historic Landmark, listed on the National Register of Historic Places in Santa Clara County
Bank of Italy (Tracy, California), listed on the National Register of Historic Places in San Joaquin County, California
Bank of Italy (Visalia, California), listed on the National Register of Historic Places in Tulare County, California